Thorsten Flick (born 22 August 1976) is a German former professional footballer who played as a midfielder. Besides Germany, he has played in Italy and Hungary.

References

External links
 
 
 Profile at magyarfutball.hu

Living people
1976 births
German footballers
Sportspeople from Darmstadt
Association football midfielders
Germany under-21 international footballers
Bundesliga players
2. Bundesliga players
Serie B players
Nemzeti Bajnokság I players
Eintracht Frankfurt players
S.S.C. Napoli players
1. FC Saarbrücken players
VfB Oldenburg players
Viktoria Aschaffenburg players
Debreceni VSC players
German expatriate footballers
German expatriate sportspeople in Italy
Expatriate footballers in Italy
German expatriate sportspeople in Hungary
Expatriate footballers in Hungary